The PDC World Darts Championship, known for sponsorship purposes as the Cazoo World Darts Championship, organised by the Professional Darts Corporation (PDC), is a World Professional Darts Championship held annually in the sport of darts. The PDC championship begins in December and ends in January and is held at Alexandra Palace in London and has been held there since 2008. It is the most prestigious of the PDC's tournaments, with the winner receiving the Sid Waddell Trophy, named in honour of the darts commentator Sid Waddell, who died in 2012. Along with the Premier League Darts and World Matchplay, it is considered part of the Triple Crown.

The PDC championship began in 1994 as the WDC World Darts Championship as one of the consequences of the split in darts, which saw the World Darts Council break away from the BDO. As a result of the settlement between the BDO and the WDC in 1997, the WDC became the PDC, and players were thenceforth free to choose which world championship to enter (but not both in the same year), as long as they met certain eligibility criteria. Both organisations continued to organize their own world championship until the 2020 editions, after which the BDO folded.

There have been eleven different winners since the tournament's inception. With 14 wins from 25 appearances, Phil Taylor has dominated the competition, last winning it in 2013. The other players to win it more than once are John Part (2003 & 2008), Adrian Lewis (2011 & 2012), Gary Anderson (2015 & 2016), Michael van Gerwen (2014, 2017 & 2019) and Peter Wright (2020 & 2022). The one-time winners are the inaugural champion Dennis Priestley (1994), Raymond van Barneveld (2007), Rob Cross (2018), Gerwyn Price (2021) and  Michael Smith (2023).

History

In 1992, some high-profile players, including all previous winners of the BDO World Darts Championship still active in the game, formed the WDC (now PDC), and in 1994, held their first World Championship. Dennis Priestley won the inaugural competition.

The players who broke away were taking a significant gamble – the tournament was broadcast on satellite television rather than terrestrial, and from 1994 to 2001, the prize fund for the players in the WDC/PDC World Championship was lower than the prize fund in the BDO version, although the 1997 PDC World Champion received £45,000 compared to that year's BDO World Champion receiving £38,000. In 2002, the PDC prize fund overtook that of the BDO for the first time, and the PDC event now boasts the largest prize fund of any darts competition. In 2010, the prize fund reached £1 million for the first time, with the World Champion collecting £200,000.

The 2014 and 2015 PDC World Champions collected £250,000 for their respective wins. For the next, winner's share increased to £50,000 each year culminating in a 2018 prize fund of £1.8 million. The current prize fund for the tournament is £2.5 million with £500,000 to the winner, as set since the 2019 edition.

In 2020, the British Darts Organisation — which had held a separate version of the world championship since the split in 1994 — went into liquidation. As a result, the PDC version was briefly the only recognised world championship in darts until the 2022 WDF World Darts Championship was held.

Venue

The PDC World Darts Championship has been held at Alexandra Palace in London since 2008, having previously been held at the Circus Tavern in Purfleet, Essex, from 1994 to 2007. Currently, the play takes place inside the venue's West Hall, which has a capacity of 3,200.

List of finals

Records and statistics

Total finalist appearances

 Active players are shown in bold
 Only players who reached the final are included
 In the event of identical records, players are sorted in alphabetical order by family name

Champions by country

Nine-dart finishes
Fourteen nine-dart finishes have been thrown at the World Championship. The first one was in 2009.
Two have been made in world finals firstly by Adrian Lewis in 2011 and Michael Smith in 2023.

Averages
Since the breakaway of the PDC players, there has been much debate about the relative merits of the players within each organisation. The debate often focuses on the three-dart averages of players in matches.

An average over 100 in a match in the PDC World Championship has since been achieved 195 times. This is compared to 21 times in the BDO World Championship, following the 2019 event. In 2010 Phil Taylor became the first player to average over 100 in all six rounds of the tournament. He repeated this feat (though lost the final) in 2015 and Michael van Gerwen achieved it in 2017 and 2019.

An average of over 105 in a match in the PDC World Championship has been achieved 40 times. The highest match average ever in the BDO World Championship is 103.83 by Raymond van Barneveld in his quarter-final victory over John Walton in 2004.

Records
Most titles: 14, Phil Taylor. Taylor's two BDO titles take his total to 16, a record across both organisations.
Most finals: 19, Phil Taylor, 1994–2007, 2009–2010, 2013, 2015 and 2018. Taylor's two BDO finals take his total to 21, a record across both organisations.
Most match wins: 110, Phil Taylor, 1994–2018. Taylor has only lost 11 matches at the tournament and reached every final from 1994 until 2007, before being beaten in the quarter-finals by Wayne Mardle in 2008.
Longest unbeaten run: 44 matches, Phil Taylor, 1995–2003, between his defeats in the 1994 and 2003 finals. 
Most 180s in a tournament (total): 901 in 2023.
Most 180s in a tournament (individual): 83, Michael Smith (2022)
Most 180s in a match: 24, Peter Wright (2022 semi-final) and Michael Smith (2022 final) 
Most 180s in a match (both players): 42, Gary Anderson (22) and Michael van Gerwen (20) (2017 final)
Longest streak of 100+ averages: 19 matches, Michael van Gerwen, 2016–2019
Most appearances: 25, Phil Taylor.
Youngest player: Mitchell Clegg, 16 years and 37 days in 2007. Clegg had qualified as a 15-year-old. He was younger than Michael van Gerwen, who set the BDO World Championship youngest player record a few weeks later.
Youngest finalist: Kirk Shepherd, 21 years and 88 days In the 2008 final, Shepherd was two days younger than Jelle Klaasen, who won the BDO title in 2006.
Record TV audience UK: 1,500,000 (2015 Final). The 2007 final was the first time that Sky Television achieved a viewing figure of over 1 million for a darts match. The 2013 final had a 1.2 million average, with 10 million viewers over the course of the tournament.
Record TV audience: 2,170,000 (2017 Final). The record was set during the Dutch broadcast (RTL7) of the 2017 final between Dutchman Michael van Gerwen and Gary Anderson. The 2018 final holds the record for highest combined audience in the UK, Netherlands and Germany with over 4.4 million viewers.  
Won both World Championships: Four players. Dennis Priestley was the first player to win both versions of the World Championship, winning the 1991 BDO Championship and the 1994 PDC Championship. Phil Taylor, John Part and Raymond van Barneveld have since matched the feat.
Overseas World Champions: Three players. John Part was the first player from outside the UK to win the PDC World Championship with his 2003 title, followed by Raymond van Barneveld in 2007 and Michael van Gerwen in 2014. Part was also the first overseas player to win the BDO title, doing so in 1994.
Youngest World Champion: Michael van Gerwen was 24 years and 9 months old when he won the title in 2014.
Oldest World Champion: Phil Taylor was 52 years and 5 months old when he won his last world title in 2013.

Media

Domestic broadcaster
The PDC World Championship has been broadcast live and in its entirety by Sky Sports in the UK since its inception. Since 2009 the tournament has been presented in High Definition (HD). Their coverage is currently presented from a studio overlooking the interior of the Alexandra Palace venue.

The current presenting team is as follows:

Presenters:
 Emma Paton: (2020–present) 
 Anna Woolhouse: (2022–present)

Commentators:
 Stuart Pyke: (2003–present)
 Rod Studd: (2009–present)
 Dan Dawson: (2022–present)

Co-commentators/pundits:
 Wayne Mardle: (2010–present)
 John Part: (2013–present)
 Mark Webster: (2018–present)
 Laura Turner: (2019–present)
 Corrine Hammond: (2022–present)

Former presenters and commentators have been:
 Dave Lanning: (1993–2010 & 2013)
 John Gwynne: (1993–2013, 2016)
 Sid Waddell: (1994–2012)
 Jeff Stelling: (1993–2002, 2005)
 David Bobin: (1994, 2002–2003)
 Helen Chamberlain: (2003–2009)
 Jonathan Green: (2000)
 Laura "Laure" James (2014–2016)
 Eric Bristow: (1993–2016)
 Dave Clark: (2001–2020)
 Colin Lloyd: (2020)
 Rod Harrington: (2005–2020)
 Nigel Pearson (2006-2022)
 David Croft: (2013–2021)
 Laura Woods: (2018–2022)
 Devon Petersen: (2019–2022)
 Adam Smith: (2020–2022)

Overseas broadcasters
Dutch broadcaster SBS6, having covered the BDO World Darts Championship for many years, also covered the event until RTL7 took over broadcasting. TV3 Sport (Denmark), Fox Sports (Australia), TSN (Canada), SuperSport (South Africa), Sky Sport (New Zealand), StarHub (Singapore), Ten Sports (India), CCTV (China), Showtime (Middle East), Ukraine TV, TVP Sport (Poland), NOVA Sport (Czech Republic and Slovakia), Sport1 (Hungary), Meersat (Malaysia), 7TV (Russia), Measat (Indonesia), J Sports (Japan), DAZN (USA, Italy), GOL TV (Spain) Eurosport (Romania), Viaplay (Iceland) and VTM4 (Belgium) now also broadcast the event.

Viewing figures
Television viewing figures for the final are as follows:

Webcasting
The PDC world championship events are now broadcast on www.livepdc.tv which shows the events live, highlights and also classic matches. This website is a subscription only viewing and is limited to certain territorial restrictions.

Video games 
The PDC have worked with various video game developers since 2006 to create a number of darts-themed titles based on the World Darts Championship tournament.

Their first game PDC World Championship Darts was developed by Mere Mortals for the PlayStation 2 and PC. The second game in the series was PDC World Championship Darts 2008 developed by Mere Mortals for the PlayStation 2, PC, PlayStation Portable, Wii and Xbox 360. A year later Rebellion Developments took over development of the series, releasing PDC World Championship Darts 2009 for the Wii and Nintendo DS.

The most recent PDC World Darts Championship console game to be released was PDC World Championship Darts Pro Tour a darts video game for the PlayStation 3, Wii and Xbox 360. This game is the most comprehensive of the series featuring ten professional players and five official PDC tournaments including the PDC World Grand Prix, Las Vegas Desert Classic, PDC UK Open and the Holland Open.

In 2021 the PDC collaborated with Blueprint Gaming to develop PDC World Darts Championship, an officially licensed slots game available to play on mobile devices and PC, the game was released in February 2021.

Sponsor
The tournament has been sponsored by online car retailer Cazoo in 2023. Previous sponsors have been:
 Skol (1994)
 Proton Cars (1995)
 Vernon's Pools (1996)
 Red Band (1997)
 Skol (1998–2002)
 Ladbrokes (2003–2014)
 William Hill (2015–2022)
 Cazoo (2023–)

Trophy
Following popular darts commentator Sid Waddell's death on 11 August 2012, the decision was made to rename the champion's trophy to the Sid Waddell trophy from the 2013 tournament onwards.

Notes and references

External links
 World Championship page on the PDC website
 PDC World Darts Championship on Darts database

 
World Championship
Alexandra Palace
PDC
Recurring sporting events established in 1994
1994 establishments in England
Annual sporting events in the United Kingdom
International sports competitions hosted by England